Ivej (also Romanized as Īvej) is a village in Farsesh Rural District, in the Central District of Aligudarz County, Lorestan Province, Iran. In 2006, its population was 309, in 58 families.

References 

Towns and villages in Aligudarz County